Prey Khpos is a khum (commune) of Bavel District in Battambang Province in north-western Cambodia.

Villages

 Ta Hi
 Pou
 Ta Mat
 Meakkloea
 Prey Khpos
 Sranal
 Dangkao Pen
 Kbal Thnal
 Boeng Chra Nieng

References

Communes of Battambang province
Bavel District